Tracy A. Sugarman (1921 – January 20, 2013) was an American illustrator.  He illustrated hundreds of books and record covers in a career lasting over 50 years.  He authored an annotated work on his sketches from World War II.

He was a naval officer on D-Day when he led his troops on an amphibious assault of Utah beach. Following his service in the U.S. Navy in World War II, Sugarman moved to Connecticut, United States and embarked on a career in illustration.  He illustrated books and articles for more than 50 years, including numerous children's books.

He was also an illustrator of record covers, primarily for Waldorf Music Hall Records/Grand Award Records.  The early ten inch records on Waldorf Music Hall are apparently also designed by him.  The later covers on Grand Award use his illustrations in the middle of a frame design.  Many illustrations from the earlier series reappear on the later records.  He designed more than 100 covers in the years 1950-1959.  Perhaps the best known are the covers for albums by "Knuckles O'Toole", a ragtime piano player made up by the Grand Award company.  The real pianist is either Billy Rowland or Dick Hyman.  These have been reissued on CD with the original covers on Siggnal Sounds records. His illustrations appeared in hundreds of magazines and books, and was featured on PBS, ABC TV, NBC TV, and CBS TV.  Along with his career as an illustrator, he also was a talented artist, scriptwriter, civil rights activist, producer, and author. He won numerous awards from the Society of Illustrators in New York and the Art Directors Club in Washington, D.C.

Sugarman's earlier career was a U.S. Navy Reserve ensign who served on an amphibious boat during the D-Day invasion of Normandy June 6, 1944. Among Tracy's many works is “My War.” In 2000 he published a collection of over 400 letters, drawings and watercolours he sent to his young wife, during the harrowing days of World War II. His collection from this period was acquired by the Veterans History Project, at the Library of Congress.

Some of his most iconic work involved the civil-rights movement in the 1960s. As a visual journalist, he covered the appalling conditions in  Rikers Island jail for the New York Times and the Malcolm X trial for the Saturday Evening Post.

Sugarman left his Connecticut home to join the students heading south in the summer of 1964. He decided to use his talents to tell their stories to the American public. He attended the orientation in Oxford, Ohio, and spent ten weeks in Ruleville in the heart of the Delta. There he formed close friendships with veteran activists Fannie Lou Hamer and Charles McLaurin. He also befriended the college students working on voter registration and teaching in Freedom Schools. "They were terrified every day, but they went out and did their job," he observed. Stranger at the Gates, published in 1966, is Sugarman's deeply personal account of that summer, illustrated with dozens of his evocative drawings. In the preface he wrote, "No one who went to Mississippi in 1964 returned the same. I came home from the dusty roads of the Delta with a deeper understanding of patriotism, an unshakable respect for commitment, and an abiding belief in the power of love."

We Had Sneakers, They Had Guns, published in 2009, is a sequel to his earlier work in which Sugarman reflected on the relationships formed that summer and how his life and the lives of his fellow volunteers were shaped by their experiences. It is both a personal memoir and a collective biography of the people he met in Mississippi.

Sugarman was one of the principals behind Rediscovery Productions which he formed to produce documentary films about often overlooked black contributors who enriched American society. One of its early projects was "Never Turn Back: The Life of Fannie Lou Hamer." At the age of ninety-one, Tracy Sugarman completed his first novel, Nobody Said Amen, the fictional story of two Mississippi families, one black and one white, coping with the turbulent changes brought by the Civil Rights Movement. He brought to life the courage and commitment of those who fought for justice as part of the Mississippi Freedom Summer Project.

References

 Sugarman, Tracy: My war: a love story in letters and drawings.  New York: Random House, 2000. 
 Sugarman, Tracy: Stranger at the Gates.  New York: Hill and Wang, 1966.
 Meglin, Nick: On-The-Spot-Drawing.  Watson-Guptill Publications, Incorporated (September 1, 1976), .Sugarman is one of 15 illustrators interviewed.
 Art in the Face of War (2006, Documentary, USA, 76 minutes), Director / Screenwriter / Producer: David BaugnonSugarman is one of eight artist/soldiers interviewed.

External links 
 Experiencing War, includes video interviews and images of Sugarman's work

1921 births
2013 deaths
American illustrators
United States Navy personnel of World War II